Eduard Shaihullin (20 October 1974 – 6 June 2020) was a Russian  motorcycle speedway rider who was a member of Russia team at 2001 and 2002 Speedway World Cup. He died on 6 June 2020, aged 45.

Honours

World Championships 
 Team World Championship (Speedway World Team Cup and Speedway World Cup)
 2001 –  – 8th place (3 pts in Race-off)
 2002 –  – 9th place (1 pt in Event 3)

European Championships 
 European Club Champions' Cup
 2000 –  Piła – Runner-up (2 pts)

See also 
 Russia national speedway team

References 

Russian speedway riders
Place of birth missing
Place of death missing
1974 births
2020 deaths